The 2015 Judo Grand Slam was held in Tokyo, Japan, from 4 to 6 December 2015.

Medal summary

Men's events

Women's events

Source Results

Medal table

References

External links
 

2015 IJF World Tour
2015 Judo Grand Slam
Judo
Grand Slam, 2015
Judo
Judo